Semić is a village in the municipality of Lupoglav, in Istria County, Croatia. In 2001, the village had 99 residents.

References

Populated places in Istria County